Sri Lanka is divided into nine provinces and Uva Province has a distinct place among them. The natural environment and the history of the province are the main reasons for this.

Name
When the wind blows through the mountains, a "hoo" sound is generated. It is believed from the tales that the word "hoo-wa" is later transformed into "Uva". But how and when it is used is never mentioned.

Establishment
In the 19th century Governor of Ceylon, Lord Arthur Hamilton-Gordon established the Uva province. Before that the divisions Bintenna, Wiyaluwa, Wellassa, Udukinda, Yatikinda belonged to Central Province and Wellawaya and Buttala belonged to the Southern Province.

Administration divisions
The province had been divided into seven provincial financial control divisions
 Udukinda
 Yatikinda
 Buttala
 Wellawaya
 Wellassa
 Wiyaluwa
 Bintenna

Udukinda and Yatikinda
The word "Kinda" denotes the land. An area with a higher elevation is called "Udukinda" and an area with a lower elevation is called "Yatikinda"

The areas with a higher elevation, such as Pattipola, Ohiya, Haputale, Welimada, Gurutalawa, Ambewela and Ettampitiya were placed in "Udukinda". Areas with lower elevation such as Badulla, Passara, Lunugala, Demodara, Ella, Hali-Ela, Narangala and Spring-Vally were placed in "Yatikinda".

Buttala
During the era of King Dutugemunu the path way from Northern province to the southern province passed through Buttala.  A free meal was given to people who travelled from the north to the south. The place where the free meal was given called "Bath Hala", and name "Bath Hala" was later transformed into "Buttala".

Wellawaya
When compared to the other divisions of the Uva province, Wellawaya area is very much closer to the sea. The area has a lower elevation and fewer mountains. Therefore, this area is touched with the wind from the sea, which was called "Welle Wayuwa". It is believed the  name "Welle Wayuwa" later became "Wellawaya".

Bintenna
The large area around Mahiyangana was called "Bintenna".

Wiyaluwa
Bamboo trees were called as "Wiyalu". The area with a large number of bamboo trees, was named as "Wiyaluwa".

Village Councils before 1950
During and after the British Ceylon period, the Uva Province was administered as several Village Councils and Town Councils. Later these administration units were transformed into Municipal Councils, Urban Councils and Provincial Councils.
 Bintenna
 Palwatta Arulupitiya
 Oya Palatha
 Soranathota
 Wiyaluwa
 Dehivini Palata
 Dambavini Palatha
 Gampaha
 Meda Palatha
 Yati Palatha
 Uda Palatha
 Rilpola
 Kumbalwela
 Bogoda
 Passara
 Pattipola
 Wegam pattu Nilagala
 Medagam Pattu
 Dambagalla
 Buttala
 Wellawaya
 Kanda Pallena No 01
 Kandapallena No 02
 Kandukara
 Buttala Wedirata

See also
 Uva Rebellion
 Keppetipola Disawe
 Battle of Randeniwela

References